Alter Druyanov (July 6 1870 – May 10, 1938)  was a Russian Jewish writer, editor, translator, folklorist, journalist, historian of early Zionism, and Zionist activist. His pen name derived from his birthplace, Druya, was variously transliterated as  Druyanow, Drujanow, etc.) He wrote both in Yiddish and Hebrew languages.

Alter Druyanov was born in Druya (in Vilna Governorate, Russian Empire, now in Belarus) to a wealthy family of a Chasidic rabbi and merchant Eliakim Pesach (Hetzel Yankelevich).

Books
Ketavim le-toledot Chibbat Zion we-Jischuv Erez Israel,  vol. I Odessa 1918, vols. II, III, Tel Aviv 1925/1932, (annotated collection of documents of Hibbat Zion period of Hovevei Zion under Leon Pinsker
Sefer ha-Bedicha ve-ha-Chidud (ספר הבדיחה והחידוד), 1922
פינסקר וזמנו ("Pinsker and His Time")

References

Further reading
 "ALTER DRUYANOV (AVROM-ABE OSHER)", from Yiddish Leksikon, by Joshua Fogel

1870 births
1938 deaths
Yiddish-language writers
Yiddish-language journalists